Sylvestre Amoussou (born 1964) is a Beninese actor turned film director, best known for his 2006 film Africa Paradis, a satire on immigration.

Life

Amoussou was born 31 December 1964 in Benin. After living in France for twenty years, and experiencing the lack  of interesting roles offered to black actors in France, he decided to make his own movies. In Africa Paradis, the politics of immigration is turned on its head: the economic fortunes of Europe and Africa are reversed, and immigrants struggle to gain entrance to Africa from Europe. Amoussou's anti-colonial film The African Storm (2017) received an enthusiastic reception from audiences at the Panafrican Film and Television Festival of Ouagadougou and received the festival's Silver Stallion of Yennega prize.

Filmography
 Africa paradis, 2006
 Un pas en avant - Les dessous de la corruption [One Step Forward - The Bottom of Corruption], 2011
 L'Orage africain: Un continent sous influence [The African Storm], 2017

References

External links
 

1964 births
Living people
Beninese film directors